Segundo Macalalad (born 1 June 1940) is a Filipino boxer. He competed in the men's flyweight event at the 1960 Summer Olympics.

References

1940 births
Living people
Filipino male boxers
Olympic boxers of the Philippines
Boxers at the 1960 Summer Olympics
People from Lucena, Philippines
Flyweight boxers